Mathias Fritschler Barr (December 6, 1831 in Edinburgh - December 21, 1911 in London) was a Scottish poet.

Barr's father, Fidelie Barr, was a native of Germany, who had married the Edinburgh native Margaret Mcdonald, and carried on the business of a watchmaker in that city. Barr received a liberal education at the High School and Academy of Edinburgh, then paid a brief visit to Germany, and afterwards removed to London, where he held a respectable appointment for a number of years, devoting his leisure hours to the cultivation of his literary tastes. Among his pursuits, Barr owned a music-selling and publishing establishment in London.

In 1865 his first-published volume of poems appeared, and he thereafter issued several short volumes of well-regarded verse. He was compared to Burns and Wordsworth in finding the inspiration of song in the most common objects. The simplest scenes, the homeliest incidents, the most common wild-flowers, were subjects addressed by Barr.

Sources
Alexander G. Murdoch, The Scottish Poets Recent and Living: recent and living (1883), p. 262-63.

External links

 
 

1831 births
1911 deaths
Writers from Edinburgh
Scottish poets